Lizzie Doron (born 1953) is an Israeli author.

Biography
Her mother was a German Holocaust survivor. Doron was born in Israel and served in the Israeli Defense Force. She also lived on a kibbutz. She eventually moved to Tel Aviv. One of her children now lives in Germany. Doron formerly worked as a linguist at the University of Tel Aviv. In the fall term of 2019 she was the twelfth Friedrich Dürrenmatt Guest Professor for World Literature at the University of Bern.

Doron writes about her family history, personal experiences and the Arab–Israeli conflict. Her book, "Peaceful Times", is about a woman living in Tel Aviv who forgets her childhood in World War II. Doron has also written about her changing views of the country.

Positions
Doron said in a 2005 interview that she no longer shares some of the classical Zionist convictions, such as the view that Arabs, rather the internal Israeli Jewish conflicts, were the country's main problem. One of her worries is the growing weight of religion in Israeli society. All this makes her pessimistic about the future, which has to be approached with radical openness and more detached from the traumas of the past.

Awards and recognition
Other than in Germany and Switzerland, as of 2008, Doron's recognition in Israel had still been modest.

Buchman Prize by Yad Vashem Holocaust Martyrs and Heroes Remembrance Authority (2003)
Jeanette Schocken Prize – Bremerhaven Citizens' Prize for Literature for her entire oeuvre (2007)
Her book Once There Was A Family was chosen among the 30 best books of 2007 by the Swiss newspaper Neue Zurcher Zeitung
 for literature, awarded by the Municipality of Holon (2010)

References

1953 births
Living people
Israeli women writers
Israeli people of German-Jewish descent
Israeli female military personnel